Jimmy Connors won in the final 6–3, 7–6 against Ivan Lendl.

Seeds

  Jimmy Connors (champion)
  Ivan Lendl (final)
  Harold Solomon (semifinals)
  Brian Teacher (first round)
  Roscoe Tanner (quarterfinals)
  Yannick Noah (first round)
  Eliot Teltscher (semifinals)
  Brian Gottfried (quarterfinals)
  Eddie Dibbs (third round)
  Johan Kriek (second round)
  Victor Amaya (first round, retired)
  Kim Warwick (first round)
  Robert Lutz (third round)
  Tomáš Šmíd (quarterfinals)
  José Higueras (second round)
  Mel Purcell (third round)

Draw

Finals

Top half

Section 1

Section 2

Bottom half

Section 3

Section 4

External links
 1981 Grand Marnier Tennis Games Men's Singles draw

Grand Marnier Tennis Games - Singles